The Spanish Evangelical Church ( [IEE]) is a united denomination; Presbyterians, Methodists, Lutherans, Congregationalists participated in the merger. It was established in the wake of religious tolerance in Spain in 1869. The first General Assembly was in Seville in 1872, where the name of the Spanish Christian Church was adopted, later changed to the current name.

In 1980 it was officially recognised by the government. It is a member of the Evangelical Federation of Spain, and the World Communion of Reformed Churches and has good contact with the Spanish Reformed Episcopal Church and the World Methodist Council.

It recognises the Apostles Creed, Athanasian Creed, Nicene Creed, Heidelberg Catechism and Second Helvetic Confession. Partner churches are the Reformed Church of France, the Church of Scotland, and the Presbyterian Church in Ireland. The Iglesia Evangélica Española has about 10,000 members in 40 congregations and 50 house fellowships.

See also 
 Protestantism in Spain
 Anglicanism in Spain
 Evangelical Presbyterian Church in Spain
 Federation of Evangelical Religious Entities of Spain
 Reformed Churches in Spain
 Spanish Evangelical Lutheran Church
 Union of Evangelical Baptists of Spain

References

External links
Official website

Evangelicalism in Spain
United and uniting churches
Members of the World Communion of Reformed Churches
Religious organizations established in 1869
1869 establishments in Spain
Presbyterian denominations